Windy Peak is the name of several mountain summits:

Antarctica
Windy Peak (Antarctica)

Canada
Windy Peak (Alberta)

United States

Alaska
Windy Peak (Alaska)

California
Windy Peak (Sierra Nevada)  
Windy Peak (Siskiyou Mountains)

Colorado
Windy Peak (Kenosha Mountains)  
Windy Peak (Front Range)

Idaho
Windy Peak (Snake River Range)  
Windy Peak (Clearwater Mountains)

Nevada
Windy Peak (Nevada)

Oregon
Windy Peak (Oregon)

Utah
Windy Peak (Utah)

Washington
Windy Peak (Washington)

Wyoming
Windy Peak (Wyoming)

See also
Big Windy Peak